Aerovel Corporation was founded in 2006 by Dr. Tad McGeer, a designer of unmanned aerial systems (UAS) at various companies for more than 25 years. Dr. McGeer co-founded The Insitu Group in 1992, where he was the architect of Aerosonde, SeaScan and ScanEagle. Aerovel Flexrotor is the next evolution in Dr. McGeer's line of unmanned aerial systems.

Product

The Aerovel Flexrotor unmanned aerial system (UAS) is designed for maritime and land-based operations, day and night, and combines endurance and expeditionary capabilities. It needs a 20' by 20' area for launch and recovery. Flexrotor takes off and lands vertically (VTOL) and then transitions into horizontal wing-borne flight. It flies completely automatically after takeoff, with no pilot intervention needed. Flexrotor quickly assembles for flight, can be rapidly re-stowed in its compact case for storage and transported on a small flatbed truck.

Aerovel Flexrotor has a flight endurance of more than 32 hours, which is a record-setting Group 2 UAS flight endurance, and a 100-kilometer communications range. It is an all-weather aircraft that has operated in harsh conditions including off of various vessels in the Arctic and tropics.

A fixed-wing aircraft, Aerovel Flexrotor requires no runway or launch and retrieval equipment.  It is designed for observation, monitoring, intelligence gathering, communications relay, surveillance, reconnaissance, security and scientific data collection. It can be used for a diverse range of commercial, civil and military applications at sea and on land.

References 

Aviation companies
Aerospace companies of the United States
Manufacturing companies based in Washington (state)
Klickitat County, Washington
2006 establishments in Washington (state)